Each year the United States Congress passes a Federal Budget detailing where federal tax money will be spent in the coming fiscal year.  The budget is broken down into various Budget Activity Groups (BAG).  Below is a breakdown of the Defense Health Program (DHP) Budget Activity Group.

The Defense Health Program (DHP) Operation and Maintenance (O&M) appropriation funding provides for worldwide medical and dental services to active forces and other eligible beneficiaries, veterinary services, occupational and industrial health care, specialized services for the training of medical personnel, and medical command headquarters. Included are costs associated with the delivery of the TRICARE benefit which provides for the health care of eligible active duty family members, retired members and their family members, and the eligible surviving family members of deceased active duty and retired members.

Other Resources
 2012 MHS Stakeholders Report
 MHS brief to Institute of Medicine

References

United States Department of Defense
United States federal budgets